The Auster J/3 Atom was a 1940s British single-engined two-seat high-wing touring monoplane built by Auster Aircraft Limited at Rearsby, Leicestershire.

History
The Atom was an attempt to create a lower-powered version of the J-2 Arrow. A modified Arrow was flown with a 65 hp Continental A65-12 engine and designated the J/3 Atom. Only the prototype, registered G-AHSY, (c/n 2250) was built as the aircraft was not developed further. Another example G-AJIJ (c/n 2401) was not completed.

The sole J/3 was dismantled at Rearsby in 1950 and was rebuilt to J/4 standard with a new registration G-AJYX and c/n 2941. It crashed near Melton Mowbray on 22 April 1951 after a pilotless take-off from Rearsby. The Continental A65 engine had been replaced by a 95 hp Blackburn Cirrus Minor II. This aircraft has since been deregistered by the CAA.

Specifications (J-3)

References
Notes

Bibliography

External links
 Auster net page 22 – History of G-AHSY
 Auster net page 29 – History of G-AJYX
 CAA history G-AHSY
 CAA History G-AJYX
 Aeroengine – Continental Engines

High-wing aircraft
Single-engined tractor aircraft
1940s British civil utility aircraft
Auster aircraft
Aircraft first flown in 1946